The 1960 NAIA football season was the fifth season of college football sponsored by the National Association of Intercollegiate Athletics. The season was played from August to December 1960, culminating in the fifth annual NAIA Football National Championship, played this year for the last time at Stewart Field in St. Petersburg, Florida. During its four years in St. Petersburg, the game was called the Holiday Bowl.

Lenoir Rhyne, who lost the 1959 championship game, defeated Humboldt State in the championship game, 15–14, to win their first NAIA national title.

Conference standings

Postseason

† The game ended in a tie but Lenoir Rhyne advanced based on having more total penetrations within Northern Michigan's 20 yard line.

See also
 1960 NCAA University Division football season
 1960 NCAA College Division football season

References

 
NAIA Football National Championship